Raul José Trindade Meireles (born 17 March 1983) is a Portuguese former professional footballer who played as a midfielder.

After starting out at Boavista, he signed with Porto in 2004, going on to appear in 198 official games and win ten major trophies, including four Primeira Liga titles in a row. From 2010 to 2012 he competed in the Premier League, with Liverpool and Chelsea, winning the 2012 Champions League with the latter; he also spent several seasons in Turkey, with Fenerbahçe.

A Portugal international since 2006, Meireles represented the country in two World Cups and two European Championships, earning a total of 73 caps and scoring ten goals. He also played Olympic football in 2004.

Club career

Boavista
Meireles was born in Porto, and joined local Boavista FC's youth system at the age of seven. He spent two years on loan to C.D. Aves in the Segunda Liga, being presented on 8 July 2001.

Meireles scored his first senior goal on 25 May 2003, in a 2–1 home win over C.F. União where he fired from 30 metres into the net. He finished that season with 26 appearances, helping his team to finish in sixth position.

For the 2003–04 campaign, Meireles returned to Boavista. He made his debut in the Primeira Liga on 17 August against S.L. Benfica, being chosen Player of the match of the 0–0 home draw by newspaper Record.

Porto
On 7 July 2004, FC Porto signed Meireles on a five–year contract, being presented in a press conference held five days later. His first competitive match took place on 22 September against U.D. Leiria at the Estádio do Dragão, coming off the bench early into the first half on an eventual 1–1 league draw. On 18 February of the following year he made his first start, in an away victory over C.F. Os Belenenses. Five days later, he made his debut in the UEFA Champions League by featuring the full 90 minutes in a 1–1 home draw with Inter Milan in the round-of-16 first leg; he finished his first year with 15 appearances in all competitions (no goals).

Meireles started in Porto's first league fixture of 2005–06, against C.F. Estrela da Amadora, sustaining an ankle injury that sidelined him for one month. He returned to action in October, in a Taça de Portugal tie with F.C. Marco.

On 19 February 2006, Meireles scored his first goal for the Dragons in his 50th league appearance, giving a 1–0 home victory over C.S. Marítimo. He netted his second three matchdays later in a 2–0 defeat of Vitória de Setúbal, as the season ended with double conquest.

In the following four years, during which the domestic league was won three additional times, Meireles featured regularly in Porto's midfield, often partnering Fernando and Lucho González. He scored his first goal in the Champions League in the 2006–07 edition, a 1–1 last-16 home draw against Chelsea, coached by José Mourinho.

Liverpool

On 29 August 2010, Meireles moved to Liverpool for a fee of £11.5 million. He was awarded the No. 4 shirt, which was vacated by Alberto Aquilani who joined Juventus F.C. on loan. He made his Premier League debut on 12 September, playing 14 minutes in a 0–0 draw at Birmingham City, and his maiden appearance in the UEFA Europa League occurred four days later in the 4–1 group stage victory over FC Steaua București at Anfield where he played the entire game.

Meireles was handed his first league start on 19 September 2010, in a 3–2 away loss against Manchester United. On 16 January 2011, he scored his first goal for his new team in the 2–2 home draw with Everton, which coincided with Kenny Dalglish's first home game back as manager. His second came six days later in a 3–0 win at Wolverhampton Wanderers, when he struck a dipping 25-yard volley into the top corner of the net in the 50th minute.

On 12 February 2011, Meireles netted his fifth league goal in seven games: he put the hosts ahead midway through the first half, but Wigan Athletic eventually tied it 1–1 as Liverpool attempted to reorganise following his replacement due a stomach bug. His scoring run was rewarded with the ESPN PFA Fans' Player of the Month trophy for February, being an essential figure as the Reds climbed up the table. He finished the season with 33 matches, helping to a final sixth place and being voted the PFA Fans' Player of the Year, beating Dimitar Berbatov, David Luiz, Samir Nasri and Fernando Torres.

In the second match of the 2011–12 campaign, away against Arsenal, Meireles played 19 minutes after replacing Dirk Kuyt, and provided the assist for Luis Suárez in a 2–0 win which marked the first time they had defeated the opposition on their ground in 11 years. On 31 August, however, he asked to be transfer listed.

Chelsea
With Chelsea in the market for a midfielder following a long-term injury to Michael Essien, and an unsuccessful bid to acquire Luka Modrić from Tottenham Hotspur, the former signed Meireles to a four-year deal on 31 August 2011, for an undisclosed fee reported to be in the region of £12 million. He chose the squad number 16, due to the fact he often wore it when on international duty, and later claimed he never wanted to leave Liverpool but that the chance to work with André Villas-Boas, with whom he had spent a short period of time at Porto, was too good an opportunity to turn down.

Meireles made his debut on 10 September 2011 against Sunderland, which ended in a 2–1 away win with him setting up Daniel Sturridge's goal with a long pass. In the following month, he scored his first goal for the club during a Champions League group stage 5–0 defeat of K.R.C. Genk. On 12 December, he netted for the first time in the domestic league to contribute to a 2–1 home victory against league leaders Manchester City also at Stamford Bridge.

On 18 March 2012, Meireles scored a goal and provided two assists to Torres, who ended his 24-game goal drought in the 5–2 home triumph against Leicester City for the quarter-finals of the FA Cup. On 4 April, he scored a belter in the final minutes of a Champions League quarter-final 2–1 victory over Benfica, setting up a last-four tie with reigning champions FC Barcelona; he won his first title in English football on 5 May, after a 2–1 win against his former club Liverpool in the FA Cup final where he replaced Ramires for the last 15 minutes. He sat out the Champions League final against FC Bayern Munich by receiving a yellow card against Barcelona at Camp Nou, but was still given a medal for his participation after the 4–3 victory on penalties.

Fenerbahçe
On 3 September 2012, Meireles was sold to Fenerbahçe SK for £8 million. He was to earn €3 million in his first season, in addition to a €10,000 per-match bonus. He scored his first goal for the Turkish club on 4 October, in a 4–2 victory at Borussia Mönchengladbach in the Europa League group stage. His first in the Süper Lig came on 25 November, in a 4–1 win against Gençlerbirliği.

In December 2012, Meireles was handed an eleven-match ban by the Turkish Football Federation for spitting at a referee. The alleged actions were followed by accusations of homophobic remarks after he received a second yellow card in the second half of a 1–2 away defeat to rivals Galatasaray SK. However, the ban was reduced on appeal to four games after it was ruled that he could not have spat at the referee, being only guilty of verbal abuse.

Meireles scored once from 20 appearances in 2013–14, helping his team win the national championship after a three-year wait. During his spell in Istanbul, he shared teams with compatriots Bruno Alves, Nani and Vítor Pereira.

International career

Youth
Meireles represented the Portuguese under-16 team at the 2000 UEFA European Championship, which was won in Israel after a 2–1 defeat of the Czech Republic. He subsequently participated in the 2001 Meridian Cup with the under-17s, starting three times in an eventual third-place finish.

In November 2001, Meireles was named in the under-19 squad for the 2003 European Championship qualifying tournament, scoring in a 1–2 loss to Belarus but helping his country qualify. On 2 June 2003, he was selected by the under-20 side for the Toulon Tournament, winning the competition and being voted its second-best player.

Meireles featured regularly in the qualifying phase for the 2004 European Under-21 Championship, including a play-off tie against France where the played the full 90 minutes in a 4–1 penalty shootout victory. He was then selected by coach José Romão for the finals, appearing in four of five games to help the country qualify for the Summer Olympics– he missed the semi-finals against Italy due to suspension; in the ensuing Olympic tournament in Athens, he started twice and appeared as a second-half substitute against Iraq, as Portugal exited in the group stage with three points.

Senior

Meireles' first game for the Portuguese senior team took place on 15 November 2006, when he played the entire 3–0 win over Kazakhstan for the UEFA Euro 2008 qualifiers. He was picked for the final stages in Austria and Switzerland, marking his debut in a major international competition with a goal in the 2–0 group stage victory against Turkey (also his first), after entering the pitch in the 83rd minute. He then started alongside several reserve players in the final group clash, a 2–0 defeat to Switzerland; four days later, he replaced João Moutinho during the first half of an eventual 3–2 quarter-final loss to Germany.

On 18 November 2009, Meireles scored an important goal in the 1–0 away victory over Bosnia and Herzegovina in the second play-off game, thus securing qualification for the 2010 FIFA World Cup. He was named in Carlos Queiroz's 23-men squad, and was a starter throughout the entire tournament, netting in the 7–0 group stage rout of North Korea in Cape Town.

Meireles also appeared for Portugal at the Euro 2012 (five starts for the semi-finalists) and 2014 World Cup (two games, group stage exit) tournaments.

Style of play
Meireles could play in any position in the midfield, but preferred to operate as a central midfielder. He was capable of being deployed in both a defensive and attacking role, depending on the players available and coaches' strategies. At Porto, he was used initially as a defensive midfielder, but tactical factors saw him switch to attacking midfielder; in an opposite approach, when Paulo Bento was appointed as the Portuguese head coach in 2010, the player was eventually played in a more defensive position after starting out in attacking midfield.

Under his Liverpool manager Roy Hodgson, Meireles was also deployed as a deep-lying playmaker on occasion. A versatile, tactically astute and mobile player, his main traits were his passing and tackling, although he was also known for his work-rate and powerful long–range shooting abilities.

Outside football

Personal life
Meireles' father, Raul Meireles Sr., worked with Boavista as a masseur and encouraged his son to play football in that club when he was only six. In 2008 he married Ivone, with whom he had been in a relationship for several years. The couple met while he was a youth player, and their wedding ceremony was held at Martim Church in Barcelos, with several guests including Porto teammates Bruno Alves, José Bosingwa, Pedro Emanuel, Nuno Espírito Santo, Lucho González, Mariano González, Lisandro López and Pepe; the couple's clothes were designed by Fátima Lopes, and the christening of their daughter Lara was also performed there.

On 17 February 2009, the couple opened a clothes shop in Ermesinde, and Ivone declared that the idea made sense because both she and Meireles were interested in fashion. In January 2019, his rendition of António Variações' O Corpo é que Paga in the premiere of Lip Sync Portugal received critical acclaim.

Tattoos
Meireles was a fan of tattoos since he was 18 years old. Numerous images adorned his body, including those of Ivone and Lara. He also had a large design of a black and red Chinese-style dragon, drawn in two stages and sprawling across his back, and a huge necklace tattoo with a skull, drawn one week after his twenty-eighth birthday.

After moving to Anfield, during an interview with Liverpool's official website, Meireles jokingly said that he wanted to win the "ink championship" against teammates Daniel Agger and Martin Škrtel, due to their shared affection for tattoos.

Career statistics

Club

International

Scores and results list Portugal's goal tally first, score column indicates score after each Meireles goal.

Honours

Club

Porto
Primeira Liga: 2005–06, 2006–07, 2007–08, 2008–09
Taça de Portugal: 2005–06, 2008–09, 2009–10
Supertaça Cândido de Oliveira: 2006, 2009, 2010

Chelsea
FA Cup: 2011–12
UEFA Champions League: 2011–12

Fenerbahçe
Süper Lig: 2013–14
Turkish Cup: 2012–13
Turkish Super Cup: 2014

International
Portugal U-16
UEFA European Under-16 Championship: 2000

Portugal U-21
Toulon Tournament: 2003

Individual
PFA Fans' Player of the Month: February 2011
PFA Fans' Player of the Year: 2011

References

External links

Liverpool historic profile

1983 births
Living people
Portuguese footballers
Footballers from Porto
Association football midfielders
Primeira Liga players
Liga Portugal 2 players
Segunda Divisão players
C.D. Aves players
Boavista F.C. players
FC Porto players
FC Porto B players
Premier League players
Liverpool F.C. players
Chelsea F.C. players
Süper Lig players
Fenerbahçe S.K. footballers
UEFA Champions League winning players
FA Cup Final players
Portugal youth international footballers
Portugal under-21 international footballers
Portugal B international footballers
Portugal international footballers
UEFA Euro 2008 players
2010 FIFA World Cup players
UEFA Euro 2012 players
2014 FIFA World Cup players
Olympic footballers of Portugal
Footballers at the 2004 Summer Olympics
Portuguese expatriate footballers
Expatriate footballers in England
Expatriate footballers in Turkey
Portuguese expatriate sportspeople in England
Portuguese expatriate sportspeople in Turkey